Poonian is a village in Shaheed Bhagat Singh Nagar district of Punjab State, India. The village is administrated by Sarpanch an elected representative of the village.

Demography 
As of 2011, Poonian has a total number of 206 houses and population of 942 of which 492 include are males while 450 are females according to the report published by Census India in 2011. The literacy rate of Poonian is 75.30% lower than the state average of 75.84%. The population of children under the age of 6 years is 112 which is 11.89% of total population of Poonian, and child sex ratio is approximately 836 as compared to Punjab state average of 846.

Most of the people are from Schedule Caste which constitutes 17.20% of total population in Poonian. The town does not have any Schedule Tribe population so far.

As per the report published by Census India in 2011, 314 people were engaged in work activities out of the total population of Poonian which includes 278 males and 36 females. According to census survey report 2011, 89.49% workers describe their work as main work and 10.51% workers are involved in Marginal activity providing livelihood for less than 6 months.

Education 
sikh national college Banga
sghps Banga
sssc Banga
women college banga
Amardeep Singh Shergill Memorial college Mukandpur, KC Engineering College and Doaba Khalsa Trust Group Of Institutions are the nearest colleges.

List of schools nearby:
Govt Senior Secondary School, Ladhana Jhikka
Dashmesh Model School, Kahma
Govt High School, Jhander Kalan
Govt Gigh School, Khan Khana
Guru Ram Dass Public School, Cheta

Transport 

See also 
List of villages in India

References

External links 
 Tourism of Punjab
 Census of Punjab
 Locality Based PINCode

Villages in Shaheed Bhagat Singh Nagar district